Bhojpur Assembly constituency is one of the seats in Madhya Pradesh Legislative Assembly in India. Bhojpur Vidhan Sabha seat is a segment of Vidisha Lok Sabha constituency.

Members of Legislative Assembly

 1967: Gulabchand, Indian National Congress
 1977: Parab Chand Lakhmichand, Janata Party
 1980: Shaligram, Bharatiya Janata Party
 1985: Sunder Lal Patwa, Bharatiya Janata Party
 1990: Sunder Lal Patwa, BJP 
 1993: Sunder Lal Patwa, Bharatiya Janata Party
 1997 bypoll : Ram Kishan Chauhan (BJP), after Patwa went to Lok Sabha from Chhindwara.
 1998: Sunder Lal Patwa, Bharatiya Janata Party
 1999 bypoll : Naresh Singh Patel (BJP), after Patwa went to Lok Sabha.
 2003: Rajesh Patel (Indian National Congress), defeated debutante Surendra Patwa
 2008: Surendra Patwa, Bharatiya Janata Party
 2013: Surendra Patwa, Bharatiya Janata Party

Election results

2018 Vidhan Sabha Election

1980 Vidhan Sabha Election
 Shaligram (BJP) : 23,764 votes    
 Aslam Sher Khan (INC-I) : 13,464

See also
 Raisen
 Vidisha (Lok Sabha constituency)

References

Raisen
Assembly constituencies of Madhya Pradesh